USS Oregonian (ID-1323) was a cargo ship that served in the United States Navy from 1918 to 1919.

Oregonian was built by the Delaware River Iron Shipbuilding and Engine Works in Chester, Pennsylvania and launched in 1901. At the time of her acquisition by the United States Government on 15 August 1918 she was operated by the American-Hawaiian Steamship Company.

Oregonian was assigned Id. No. 1323 and commissioned into the Naval Overseas Transportation Service (NOTS) on 17 August 1918 at Norfolk, Virginia. After refitting and arming, she took on general cargo, joined a convoy out of Norfolk on 22 August 1918, and arrived at Brest, France, on 11 September 1918. Steaming on to St. Nazaire, France, she discharged her cargo and sailed from Le Verdon-sur-Mer, France, in convoy on 30 September 1918, arriving at New York City on 16 October 1918.

Oregonian subsequently made two more Atlantic crossings. The first was to La Pallice, Bordeaux, and Le Verdon-sur-Mer, France, returning to New York on 13 December 1918, and the second to the Mediterranean in January 1919. Following delivery of her cargo at Trieste, she returned to New York, arriving on 26 March 1919.

Ordered demobilized and returned to her owners, she decommissioned on 15 April 1919 at Brooklyn, New York.

References

Department of the Navy: Naval Historical Center Online Library of Selected Images: Civilian Ships: Oregonian (American Freighter, 1901). Served as USS Oregonian (ID # 1323) in 1918-1919.
NavSource Online: Section Patrol Craft Photo Archive Oregonian (ID 1323)

World War I cargo ships of the United States
Ships built by the Delaware River Iron Ship Building and Engine Works
1901 ships
Cargo ships of the United States Navy